The 2002 United States Senate election in Oklahoma was held on November 5, 2002. Incumbent Republican U.S. Senator Jim Inhofe won re-election to a second term.

Major candidates

Democratic 
 David Walters, former Governor

Independent 
 James Germalic

Republican 
 James Inhofe, incumbent U.S. Senator

General election

Debates
Complete video of debate, October 21, 2002
Complete video of debate, October 23, 2002

Predictions

Polling

Results

See also 
 2002 United States Senate elections

Notes

References 

United States Senate
Oklahoma
2002